Serbia participated in the Junior Eurovision Song Contest 2022 in Yerevan, Armenia.

Background

In the  contest, Serbia placed 13th with Jovana and Dunja and the song "Oči deteta (Children's Eyes)".

Before Junior Eurovision

On 10 October 2022, RTS announced that Katarina Savić would represent Serbia in the contest with the song "World Without Borders". The song "Svet bez granica" ("Свет без граница") was later released on 6 November 2022 with the title in Serbian rather than English.

At Junior Eurovision 
After the opening ceremony, which took place on 5 December 2022, it was announced that Serbia would perform fourteenth on 11 December 2022, following Portugal and preceding Armenia.

On the day of the final, it was announced that Katarina would not be performing live due to medical issues and that footage from her second rehearsal will be used instead.

Voting

Detailed voting results

References

Serbia
2022
Junior Eurovision Song Contest